The Mishnock River is a river in the U.S. state of Rhode Island. It flows . There are two dams along the river's length.

Course
The river rises at what is now Mishnock Lake in West Greenwich. From there, it flows roughly due north into Coventry where it flows through Mishnock Swamp to the South Branch Pawtuxet River at the village of Washington.

Crossings
Below is a list all crossings over the Mishnock River. The list starts at the headwaters and goes downstream.
West Greenwich
Mishnock Road
Coventry
Tiogue Avenue (RI 3)

Tributaries
Old Hickory Brook is the Mishnock River's only named tributary, though it has many unnamed streams that also feed it.

See also
List of rivers in Rhode Island

References
Maps from the United States Geological Survey

Rivers of Kent County, Rhode Island
West Greenwich, Rhode Island
Coventry, Rhode Island
Rivers of Rhode Island
Tributaries of Providence River